Victoria Hernandez-Reyes (September 10, 1954–September 30, 2016) was a Filipino politician from Tanauan, Batangas. A member of the Lakas-CMD Party, she had been elected to three terms as a member of the House of Representatives of the Philippines, representing the 3rd District of Batangas from 2001 to 2010. She first served as a member of the Batangas Provincial Board from the same district from 1998 to 2001.

She also ran for a comeback to the Congress in 2013 but lost to incumbent Sonny Collantes.

References

People from Batangas
1954 births
2016 deaths
People from Tanauan, Batangas
Members of the House of Representatives of the Philippines from Batangas
Women members of the House of Representatives of the Philippines
Lakas–CMD (1991) politicians
Nacionalista Party politicians